Marian Târșa (born 16 April 1998) is a Romanian professional footballer who plays as a midfielder for Metalul Buzău.

References

External links
 
 

1998 births
Living people
Sportspeople from Vaslui
Romanian footballers
Association football midfielders
Liga I players
Liga II players
Liga III players
FC Politehnica Iași (2010) players
FC Botoșani players
LPS HD Clinceni players